Willy Nilly is a comic strip in The Beezer and BeanoMAX about a boy with wandering feet. The strip first appeared in around 1993, and continued in the later Beezer annuals. The strip was brought back in 2011 in BeanoMAX with more modern stuff in it. The strip was drawn by David Sutherland in this version.

British comic strips
DC Thomson Comics strips